SuperX is a Linux distribution, a computer operating system originally developed in India. SuperX uses a tweaked version of KDE and is aimed towards beginners and casual users. SuperX features a new launcher made in QML that allows users to get a grid view of all icons of the installed applications in the system, the new launcher is called "SuperX App Launcher".

Name 
The name SuperX is an acronym which bears its aim of  providing a simple elegant  computing experience

SuperX stands for "Simple, User friendly, Powerful, Energetic and Robust eXperience".

Philosophy 
SuperX aims to be as simple and down-to-earth as possible avoiding bloat and unnecessary components. It aims to be as easy as possible for the non Linux users especially those who are coming from Microsoft Windows. The operating system embraces beginners, casual users and makes them feel at home. Simplicity doesn't mean feature-less. SuperX is as powerful and very handy for professionals and experts alike. The GNU utilities plus the software packages available are enough to be used for any task. SuperX is perfectly capable of being a desktop publishing setup, multimedia hub or even server. SuperX uses a tweaked version of KDE as its Graphical User Interface for providing a more polished, smooth and beautiful looking desktop experience which is delightful to use. SuperX is based on the Linux kernel with Hardware Enablement (HWE) for use on newer hardware and follows the Ubuntu LTS specifications. As a consequence, it is strong, stable and recovers quickly. It is virus and malware-free and no one can gain access to computer without knowledge. There is no need to defragment the hard-drive or clean up the registry every month, as all housekeeping is done by the operating system itself.

Features 
A default installation of SuperX contains a wide range of software that includes LibreOffice, Firefox, Ktorrent, and several lightweight games such as Kpaitence and Kacman Many additional software packages are accessible from the built in SuperX Appstore as well as any other APT-based package management tools. Many additional software packages that are no longer installed by default, are still accessible in the repositories still installable by the main tool or by any other APT-based package management tool. Cross-distribution snap packages and flatpaks are also available, that both allow installing software. The default file manager is Dolphin

All of the application software installed by default is free software. In addition, SuperX redistributes some hardware drivers that are available only in binary format, but such packages are clearly marked in the restricted component.

Technical Details

History 
SuperX was first developed in Guwahati, the capital city of Assam in India by a high school student named Wrishiraj Kausik in 2007. Later he released the first public version of SuperX in 2011 and started a company to support and promote SuperX called Libresoft (Libresoft Technology Pvt. Ltd.). Libresoft along with its supporters, funds the development of SuperX and provides support to the users. Libresoft also organizes various public events to spread awareness about open-source software and computers in general.

Its first formal release, SuperX 1.0 "Galileo", was released to selected users on April 24, 2011, and was made available to the public as a free download on October 8, 2011. The second release, SuperX v1.1 "Cassini" was released on June 21, 2012. It is an LTS version with 5 years of support.

The latest version is 5.0 "Lamarr" which was released on May 2, 2019, based on Ubuntu 18.04 and KDE Neon code base. It features a highly modified KDE workspace. Version 5.0 updates in a much slower and predictable rate and thus Qt and KDE libraries maybe not be binary compatible with KDE Neon.

It comes with 4 years of security, maintenance and standard support of all the packages and will be supported until April 2023.

Funding 
SuperX is a self-funded project of Libresoft Technology Pvt. Ltd. In 2017, Libresoft Technology Pvt. Ltd. and Assam Electronics Development Corporation Ltd. (AMTRON), the nodal agency for Government of Assam, signed a Memorandum of Understanding to distribute and deploy SuperX across the state of Assam, giving Libresoft the contract for paid support services.

Application Installation 
SuperX is based on KDE Neon which in turn is based on Ubuntu 18.04, which mean its supports most applications available for Ubuntu 18.04 and also follows the same commands as Ubuntu.  It also ships with support for snaps and flatpacks out of the box.  SuperX also have its own Appstore which have a very nice and intuitive interface to install and remove apps. However the repositories of SuperX are not 100% sync with Neon due to difference in release cycle.

System requirements 
The recommended minimum system requirements for a desktop installation are as follows:

Release history
The following is the release history for SuperX:

References

 Official SuperX Website URL
 Official SuperX Forums URL
 SuperX Distrowatch Page, Distrowatch.com  URL
 SuperX 2.0 Release announcement URL

Ubuntu derivatives
Linux distributions